The Florida Marlins' 2005 season was the 13th season for the Major League Baseball (MLB) franchise in the National League.  It would begin with the team attempting to improve on their season from 2004.  Their manager was Jack McKeon. They played home games at Dolphin Stadium. They finished with a record of 83-79, 3rd in the NL East and failed to make the playoffs for the 2nd consecutive season.

Offseason
October 8, 2004: Billy Koch was released by the Florida Marlins.
January 26, 2005: Carlos Delgado was signed as a free agent with the Florida Marlins.

Regular season

Season standings

National League East

Record vs. opponents

Roster

Player stats

Batting

Starters by position 
Note: Pos = Position; G = Games played; AB = At bats; H = Hits; Avg. = Batting average; HR = Home runs; RBI = Runs batted in

Other batters
Note: G = Games played; AB = At bats; H = Hits; Avg. = Batting average; HR = Home runs; RBI = Runs batted in

Pitching

Starting pitchers 
Note: G = Games pitched; IP = Innings pitched; W = Wins; L = Losses; ERA = Earned run average; SO = Strikeouts

Other pitchers 
Note: G = Games pitched; IP = Innings pitched; W = Wins; L = Losses; ERA = Earned run average; SO = Strikeouts

Relief pitchers 
Note: G = Games pitched; W = Wins; L = Losses; SV = Saves; ERA = Earned run average; SO = Strikeouts

Farm system

References

External links
2005 Florida Marlins at Baseball Reference
2005 Florida Marlins at Baseball Almanac

Miami Marlins seasons
Florida Marlins season
Miami